The Kids of Degrassi Street is a Canadian children's television series created by Kit Hood and Linda Schuyler. The first entry in the Degrassi franchise and the only one to focus on children instead of teenagers, it follows the lives of a group of children living on De Grassi Street in Toronto. It was produced by Hood and Schuyler's independent company Playing With Time. The series originated as a collection of annual standalone short films that started with Ida Makes a Movie, a live-action adaptation of the Kay Chorao book which premiered on the CBC on December 8, 1979. It became a full series in 1982 when the CBC ordered five more episodes.

It is notable for featuring several actors who would later star in Degrassi Junior High and Degrassi High playing different characters.

Development 
Linda Schuyler, a seventh and eighth grade teacher at Earl Grey Senior Public School in Toronto, formed the company Playing With Time with Kit Hood in 1976. At the time, Schuyler had been teaching her students an early version of media studies, which included filmmaking with Super-8 film. Discovering that there was a lack of resources on the subject, Earl Grey librarian Bruce Mackey ordered several books about filmmaking, one of which was the picture book Ida Makes a Movie, which was written by Kay Chorao.

Neither were aware that Ida Makes A Movie was a preschool book, in which the titular character was a cat. Nonetheless, Schuyler felt the story was powerful, and became interested in making a live-action adaptation, featuring children instead of cats. She sought the advice of then-lawyer and future Epitome Pictures co-founder Stephen Stohn, who advised her to forego a lawyer, and instead propose the deal herself. Schuyler flew to New York, where she met with Chorao and secured a $200 deal to adapt the book into a movie. Yan Moore, who would eventually become Degrassi Junior High and Degrassi High's head writer, became a writer for the series after he rectified problems with the story of the episode Casey Draws The Line.

Opening sequence and music 
The opening sequence consists of a short piano piece, set to black and white stills of the Leslieville neighbourhood.

Wendy Watson and Lewis Manne, who later composed the music for Degrassi Junior High and Degrassi High, composed the music for The Kids Of Degrassi Street, with John Forbes initially performing the music on a Fairlight CMI.

Cast
The Kids of Degrassi Street featured many of the same actors who would later appear on Degrassi Junior High and Degrassi High, including Stacie Mistysyn, Neil Hope, Anais Granofsky, Sarah Charlesworth, John Ioannou, in different unrelated roles.

Episodes

Broadcast
Ida Makes A Movie premiered on CBC on December 8, 1979. By 1982, the CBC, enamored with the short films that Hood and Schuyler were producing, ordered five more, effectively turning the annual movies into a television series. In the lead-up to Degrassi Junior High, the series was re-run on Sundays at 5:00pm, until it was replaced by its successor in the same timeslot. In the United Kingdom, the series debuted on BBC One on July 9, 1984, with the final episode airing on June 16, 1986. In Australia, the series debuted at 6:00pm on February 2, 1987 on ABC TV.

Print media 
In late 1986, James Lorimer & Company published a series of illustrated paperback books based on the television series, written by Schuyler and Hood with the assistance of author Eve Jennings.

Home media
On July 31, 2007, WGBH Boston Home Video released The Kids of Degrassi Street: The Complete Series on DVD in Region 1.

In Region 4, Beyond Home Entertainment released the entire series on DVD in Australia on March 12, 2008.

See also

Degrassi Junior High - The immediate successor of The Kids Of Degrassi Street, featuring several cast members from this series

Notes

References

Sources

External links
 
 Episode guide for The Kids of Degrassi Street
 Kids of Degrassi cast and character page

1979 Canadian television series debuts
1986 Canadian television series endings
1970s Canadian children's television series
1970s Canadian drama television series
Canadian television soap operas
1980s Canadian children's television series
1980s Canadian drama television series
Television shows set in Toronto
Television shows filmed in Toronto
Degrassi (franchise)
CBC Television original programming
Television series by DHX Media
Television series about children